Ferdinan Backer "Nancy" Stevenson (June 8, 1928 – May 31, 2001) was an American politician who served as Lieutenant Governor of South Carolina from 1979 to 1983. She was the first and only woman to be elected to statewide office in South Carolina until the election of Dr. Barbara Nielsen as Superintendent of Education in 1990. She previously served two terms in the South Carolina House of Representatives and, after leaving office, unsuccessfully ran for the state's 2nd congressional district seat in 1984 against incumbent Floyd Spence.

See also
List of female lieutenant governors in the United States

References

External links
 

1928 births
2001 deaths
20th-century American politicians
Smith College alumni
Women state legislators in South Carolina
Democratic Party members of the South Carolina House of Representatives
Lieutenant Governors of South Carolina
Politicians from Charleston, South Carolina
Politicians from New Rochelle, New York
20th-century American women politicians
Candidates in the 1984 United States elections